Timothy Christopher Ward is an American musician best known as the bassist and co-lead vocalist for the Mukilteo, Washington based prog-rock band The Fall of Troy and as a singer and guitarist for the band Trash Kids.

Early life and career
Ward attended Kamiak High School and graduated in 2003. He met his bandmates Andrew Forsman and Thomas Erak while there, and they began a band called The 30 Years War with another member, Mike Munro. The 30 Years War independently released two EPs. In late high school Munro left the band, and the trio decided  to continue their music, calling their new group The Fall of Troy.

The Fall of Troy
In May 2003, just before their high school graduation, The Fall of Troy entered the studio to record their first full-length album, which was released on Lujo Records and Equal Vision Records. He chipped a tooth during a stage diving incident in Detroit.

2007 departure
Ward left the band during their tour with Coheed and Cambria. He was replaced by bassist and vocalist Frank Ene on November 28, 2007. Thomas Erak stated on the band's forums that his leave was full-time and for the best interest of the band. He remained in touch with his former bandmates and offered to create artwork for the bands' future albums and merchandise. However, he was not mentioned in the liner notes for The Fall of Troy's record, In the Unlikely Event.

2013 return
In 2010, The Fall of Troy announced a hiatus. When they returned in 2013, Ward rejoined his once former bandmates, and his replacement Frank Ene was no longer with the band.

Other musical ventures
During his departure from The Fall of Troy, Ward relocated to Riggins, Idaho and in November 2008 began posting new demos on his MySpace page since under the moniker of Stranger Danger. He now makes music under the monikers "Cool Timmy" and "Messedupcoyote", both of which are signed to the online record label run by Father LongLegs "Woozy Tribe".

Trash Kids
He joined a band called Trash Kids which consisted of Ward and Tyler Koykas of The Parallax View. Ward writes lyrics as well as performing lead vocals, lead guitar, standup bass, slide guitar, and backup keys. Kyokas performs beats, samples, synthesizer, keys, guitar, bass, backup, vocals, and mixing. In 2012, Trash Kids released an LP, Get Lost, on Bandcamp which was available for pay-what-you-want download. Since then they have released three digital albums, Extra Trash, Headdancer, and Fade, Ghost, Fade As of 2015 they have released a new EP titled "Deader Than Ever" featuring Andrew Forsman.

Equipment used on tour
Basses
Fender Geddy Lee Jazz Bass in black
Fender American Jazz Bass in sunburst
Fender American Jazz Bass in red
Gibson Grabber bass in natural finish, with slide pickup

Amplifiers
Ampeg SVT Classic head
Ampeg SVT-810E 8x10 bass enclosure

Effects pedals
BOSS TU-2 Tuner
BOSS SYB-5 Bass synthesizer pedal
BOSS ODB-3 Overdrive

Others
SKB PS-15 Integrated Pedalboard

References

External links
Trash Kids website

Living people
American bass guitarists
American male singers
People from Mukilteo, Washington
Year of birth missing (living people)
American male bass guitarists
The Fall of Troy members